Al-Bidya Mosque (sometimes transliterated as Al-Bidiyah or Al-Badiyah) is a historical mosque in the Emirate of Fujairah, the United Arab Emirates. It was the oldest known mosque in the country, prior to the discovery in September 2018 of the ruins of a 1000-year-old mosque dating back to the Islamic Golden Age, near the Sheikh Khalifa Bin Zayed Al Nahyan Mosque in the city of Al Ain, Emirate of Abu Dhabi.

History
The mosque's date of construction is uncertain and because the mud and stone built structure uses no wood, radiocarbon dating is not possible. It is estimated to date to the 15th century, however some much earlier estimates have been proposed. The site was investigated by the archaeological center of Fujairah in co-operation with the University of Sydney from 1997-98. and Fujairah Archaeology and Heritage Department concluded that the mosque was believed to be built in 1446 AD, along with the two watch towers overlooking the mosque and the village.

Structure
The roof has four squats, helical domes that are supported by only one centrally placed pillar that also forms the ceiling. Entrance to the mosque is through double-winged wooden doors.

The prayer hall has a small mihrab (the niche in the wall that indicates the direction of Mecca), a simple pulpit, arches, and openings. A central pillar divides the internal space into four squares of similar dimensions. The pillar supports all four domes that can be seen from the exterior.

Inside the prayer hall, a number of small decorative windows allow light and air to enter the mosque. There are also cube-shaped spaces carved into the thick walls where copies of the Quran and other books are stored.

The mosque continues to host daily prayers, and is a tourist attraction.

See also
 Islam in the United Arab Emirates

References

External links
 
 Video: The Imam of Al Bidya mosque (The National)
 Al Bidya Mosque in Fujairah | Gulf Roundup 1 Jan 2016 (Asianet News)
 500 year old Mosque in UAE (YouTube)
 570 Year old Mosque in UAE | Al Badiyah Mosque | Life and Travel | Malayalam Travel Vlog #05

15th-century mosques
Mosques in the Emirate of Fujairah